Arthur M. Jackes (June 26, 1924 – November 10, 2000) was a Canadian high jumper. He competed at the 1948 Summer Olympics and finished sixth. Jackes was a Canadian high jump champion in 1948–1950. He finished tenth in the high jump at the 1950 British Empire Games. He retired around 1950 and later moved to the United States.

References

1924 births
2000 deaths
Athletes from Toronto
Canadian male high jumpers
Olympic track and field athletes of Canada
Athletes (track and field) at the 1948 Summer Olympics
Commonwealth Games competitors for Canada
Athletes (track and field) at the 1950 British Empire Games
University of Toronto alumni
20th-century Canadian people